Doodhpak is an Indian sweet, a kind of rice pudding made from milk, sugar, rice, saffron and nuts, accompanied by pooris. The milk is slow-boiled to thickened and sweetened and the dish is garnished with chopped dry fruits/nuts. Doodhpak originates from Gujarat.

See also
 Kheer

References

Gujarati cuisine
Indian desserts
Rice pudding